"She Cried" is a song written by Ted Daryll and Greg Richards, and it was initially recorded by Ted Daryll in July 1961, but was a big hit when covered by Jay and the Americans for their 1962 album, She Cried.  In 1962 the song reached number 5 on the Billboard Hot 100 and number 1 on WLS.  The song was the group's first major hit.

The Lettermen recorded a cover version of the song in 1964, on an album of the same name, that reached number 6 on the Adult Contemporary charts in 1970.  The song also went to number 73 on the Billboard Hot 100 the same year.

A cover version by The Shangri-Las, ("He Cried"), peaked at number 65 on the Billboard Hot 100 in May 1966.

Other cover versions
Dave Berry
Billy Fury on 1963 album, Billy
The Gestures
Rowland S. Howard
David Hasselhoff, on his album, Night Rocker (1985)
Lords of Altamont on their 2006 album, Lords Have Mercy
P.J. Proby
Del Shannon on his 1965 album, One Thousand Six-Hundred Sixty-One Seconds of Del Shannon
The Outsiders on their 1966 debut album, Time Won’t Let Me
Dodie Stevens ("I Cried")
The Mojo Men
Johnny Thunders and Patti Palladin (as "He Cried") on their 1988 album, Copy Cats

References

1962 singles
1962 songs
1970 singles
Jay and the Americans songs
The Lettermen songs
Del Shannon songs
United Artists Records singles